Greatest Hits is the first greatest hits compilation for the Jackson 5 released by Motown Records in late 1971. The top 10 single "Sugar Daddy" is included as a new track alongside hits such as "I Want You Back" and "I'll Be There".

A quadraphonic mix was released in Japan in 1975 (this quadraphonic mix was released as a folddown to stereo on an LP in November 2019), marking the first and only release of the band's material in surround sound.

Track listing

Side one
"I Want You Back"
"ABC"
"Never Can Say Goodbye"
"Sugar Daddy"  (recorded April – October 1971, during Maybe Tomorrow & Lookin’ Through the Windows sessions, at the Motown Recording Studio, Los Angeles, California) 
"I'll Be There"
"Maybe Tomorrow"

Side two
"The Love You Save"
"Who's Lovin' You"
"Mama's Pearl"
"Goin' Back to Indiana"
"I Found That Girl"

Track 1, 8 from Diana Ross Presents The Jackson 5.
Tracks 2, 7, 11 from ABC.
Tracks 5, 9, 10 from Third Album.
Tracks 3, 6 from Maybe Tomorrow.

Certifications

References

External links
Greatest Hits 1971 Overview at http://www.jackson5abc.com   

1971 greatest hits albums
Albums produced by Hal Davis
Motown compilation albums
The Jackson 5 compilation albums
Albums produced by Alphonzo Mizell
Albums produced by Berry Gordy
Albums produced by Freddie Perren
Albums produced by Deke Richards
Albums produced by the Corporation (record production team)